Adam Had Four Sons is a 1941 American romantic drama film directed by Gregory Ratoff and starring Ingrid Bergman, Warner Baxter, Susan Hayward, and Fay Wray,

Plot
Adam Stoddard is a wealthy, easy-going family patriarch who falls on hard times after the death of his wife Molly and the stock market crash of 1907 that wipes out his wealth. Recently arrived governess Emilie works to keep the family together. But with the loss of Adam's fortune, the boys are sent off to boarding school, their schooling paid for by wealthy, aged Cousin Phillipa. Emilie must return to France until Adam can afford to repurchase the family estate and recall her to look after it. Reversing his fortunes takes Adam several years. By then, the three older boys are fighting in World War I.

Just as the family is getting back to its former way of life, one son, David, returns with his new wife, Hester, who turns out be a conniving, evil woman wanting to rule the roost. Cousin Phillipa figures out the false Hester, dying before she can tell Adam. Hester schemes to rid the home of Emilie, and seduces another son, Jack, while her husband is away at war. Emilie discovers the affair, but keeps quiet to preserve Adam's happiness and the brother's reputation, pretending to Adam that she was the one involved with Jack. Later, when David returns, Hester inadvertently exclaims "Oh, Jack" while David is caressing her. Realizing her infidelity, David leaves to commit suicide by flying a plane and crashing on a stormy night. Yet, he is hospitalized and survives. Ultimately, all is discovered, and Hester receives her comeuppance and is evicted from the home. Emilie and Adam become engaged, and all ends happily.

Cast

References

External links
 
 
 
 

1941 films
1940s historical drama films
1940s historical romance films
1941 romantic drama films
American black-and-white films
American historical drama films
American historical romance films
American romantic drama films
Columbia Pictures films
Films directed by Gregory Ratoff
Films based on American novels
Films set in the 1900s
Films set in the 1910s
1940s English-language films
1940s American films